Friedrich Otto Wünsche (1839–1905) was a German mycologist.

References

1839 births
1905 deaths
German mycologists